Brańsk  is a town in eastern Poland. It is situated within Podlaskie Voivodeship (province).

Etymology
The name of the town comes from the river Bronka, a nearby tributary of the Nurzec River.

Geography

Location
Brańsk is located in the geographical region of Europe known as the Wysoczyzny Podlasko–Białoruskie (English: Podlaskie and Belarus Plateau) and the mesoregion known as the Bielsk Plain (Polish: Równina Bielska). The Nurzec River, a tributary of the Bug River, passes through Brańsk.

It is located approximately: 
  northeast of Warsaw, the capital of Poland
  southwest of Białystok, the capital of the Podlaskie Voivodeship
  west of Bielsk Podlaski, the seat of Bielsk County

Climate
The region has a continental climate characterized by high temperatures during summer and long and frosty winters . The average amount of rainfall during the year exceeds .

History

On 23–25 June 1264 the Battle of Brańsk was fought in the town's vicinity. Polish forced led by Duke Boleslaw V the Chaste defeated the forces of Yotvingia led by Komata (Kumata).

On 18 January 1493, Brańsk received a city charter based on Magdeburg rights from the Grand Duke of Lithuania, Alexander Jagiellon. It was the first city in Podlachia to receive such a charter.

Brańsk was a royal town of Poland, administratively located in the Podlaskie Voivodeship in the Lesser Poland Province of the Polish Crown. In 1795, as a result of the Third Partition of Poland, Brańsk was annexed to the Kingdom of Prussia and administered as a part of the newly formed Białystok Department. In 1807, as a result of the Treaties of Tilsit, Brańsk was annexed to the Russian Empire and administered at first as a part of Belostok Oblast and from 1842 on as a part of Grodno Governorate. The town was reintegrated with Poland, after the country regained independence following World War I in 1918.

World War II
On September 1, 1939, Germany attacked Poland and started World War II. Within days of the war's beginning, Brańsk suffered German bombardment. On September 17, 1939, the Soviet Union attacked Poland from the east, and in partnership with Nazi Germany, partitioned Poland under the terms of the Nazi-Soviet Non-Aggression Pact of August 23. Brańsk along with all areas of Poland east of the Bug River was then occupied by the Soviet Union. All Polish and Jewish businesses of substance were confiscated by the Communist State. Several Poles from Brańsk were murdered by the Russians in the large Katyn massacre in 1940. The Soviets remained in control of Brańsk until June 1941 when the Germans invaded their erstwhile Soviet allies.

The German Army occupied the town and ordered the Jewish community to build a ghetto surrounded by barbed wire, to which the Jewish population (some 65% of the town) was confined. On November 8, 1942, the Jews of Brańsk were ordered to report to the town center, forced to march to the nearby town of Bielsk, and then transported by train to Treblinka. Within weeks, the vast majority were murdered by gassing at the Treblinka extermination camp. Several local Jews were hidden and rescued by Poles (including the local parish priest) in Brańsk and nearby villages. Some hiding places in nearby villages were discovered by the Germans, who then murdered captured Jews. Their Polish rescuers were either also murdered or managed to hide from the Germans until the end of the German occupation.

On August 1, 1944, the town was captured by Soviet forces. On August 4, 1944, the Russians arrested 12 officers of the Polish underground Home Army in Brańsk, after they were deceitfully gathered for a supposed formal meeting with the command of the Soviet 65th Army. The town was soon restored to Poland.

Demographics

Population
According to the 1921 census, the village was inhabited by 3.739 people, among whom 1.474 were Roman Catholic, 100 Orthodox, and 2.165 Mosaic. At the same time, 1.530 inhabitants declared Polish nationality, 32 Belarusian, 2.165 Jewish and 12 Russian. There were 493 residential buildings in the village.

Detailed data as of 30 June 2021:

Municipal government
It is the seat of Gmina Brańsk, but is not part of Gmina Brańsk.

Executive branch
The chief executive of the government is the Mayor (Polish: Burmistrz).

Legislative branch
The legislative portion of the government is the Council (Polish: Rada) composed of the President (Polish: Przewodniczšcy), the Vice President (Polish: Wiceprzewodniczšcy) and thirteen councilors.

Neighbouring political subdivisions
Brańsk is bordered by Gminy Rudka and Brańsk.

Transport

Roads and highways
Brańsk is at the intersection of a National Road and a Voivodeship Road:

 National Road  - Zambrów - Brańsk - Bielsk Podlaski - Kleszczele - Czeremcha - Połowce Border Crossing (Belarus)
Voivodeship Road  - Roszki-Wodźki - Łapy - Brańsk - Ciechanowiec

Streets
The major streets (Polish: Ulica) in Brańsk are:

 Rynek
 Armii Krajowej (National Road )
 Bielska
 Binduga
 Boćkowska
 Błonie
 Jagiellońska
 Jana Pawła II (Voivodeship Road )
 Kapicy Milewskiego
 Kasztanowa
 Klonowa
 Konopnickiej
 Kościelna
 Kościuszki (Voivodeship Road )
 Mickiewicza
 Piłsudskiego
 Poniatowskiego
 Senatorska
 Sienkiewicza
 Skłodowskiej-Curie
 Szkolna
 Słowackiego
 Witosa
 Wyszyńskiego
 Ściegiennego

Public transport

Bus service
Regular bus service is provided by Państwowa Komunikacja Samochodowa (State Car Communication, PKS) via PKS Bielsk Podlaskie, PKS Białystok and PKS Siemiatycze

Rail service
The closest passenger train service is provided by Polskie Koleje Państwowe (Polish State Railways, PKP) SA from the following stations:

Economy
The land-use is as follows:

 Agricultural use: 66%
 Forest land: 27%
 City: 2.34%

Major business
 Financial:Banking - Bank Spóldzielczy w Brańsku, ul. Kosciuszki 2A, 17-120 Brańsk, Poland
 Manufacturing:Plastics - Wald-Gold, ul. M. Konopnickiej 20, 17-120 Brańsk, Poland

Local attractions

Places of worship

 Church of the Assumption of the Blessed Virgin Mary - Roman Catholic. The parish is serving Brańsk, Bronka, Brzeźnica, Glinnik, Jarmarkowszczyzna, Kalnica, Kiersnówek, Majerowizna, Oleksin, Otapy, Patoki, Popławy, Świrydy, Załuskie Koronne, Załuskie Kościelne. It is part of the Roman Catholic Diocese of Drohiczyn.

 St. Simeon Stylites - Polish Orthodox. It is a mission church of the Church of the Apostles St. Peter and Paul in Malesze, part of the Polish Orthodox Diocese of Warsaw-Bielsk.

Nearby attractions 

Notable people
 Jan Klemens Branicki – Polish nobleman
 Cezary Kosiński – Polish actor
 Ignatius Kapitsa-Milewski – archivist and author
 Shimon Shkop – Jewish scholar and rabbi (1906–1920)
 Moshe Rosen (Nezer HaKodesh) - Jewish scholar and rabbi (1870–1957)
 Zofia Drzewiecka – Recipient of the Righteous among the Nations Medal
 Waclawa and Pawel Sobolewski – posthumous recipients of the Righteous among the Nations Medal
 Antoni Sobolewski – posthumous recipient of the Righteous among the Nations Medal
 Aleksander Sobolewski – posthumous recipient of the Righteous among the Nations Medal

Miscellanea
 The Righteous among the Nations Medal has been granted to 14 current and former residents of Brańsk by Yad Vashem.

External links 
Jewish cemetery in Brańsk (in Polish - English Text)
Video tour of Brańsk on YouTube

References 

Cities and towns in Podlaskie Voivodeship
Bielsk County
Podlachian Voivodeship
Belsky Uyezd (Grodno Governorate)
Białystok Voivodeship (1919–1939)
Belastok Region
Shtetls
Holocaust locations in Poland